The True Montenegro (abbr. Права / Prava or ПЦГ / PCG) is a right-wing populist political party in Montenegro, formed in January 2018 from the political movement Resistance to Hopelessness (OB), prior to the March 2018 presidential election. Its founder and current leader is Marko Milačić, former journalist and political activist.

History
After a series of unsuccessful attempts by the entire opposition to nominate a common candidate for 2018 presidential election executive board of newly formed True Montenegro has decided to support the previously-announced candidacy of the party leader Marko Milačić for President of Montenegro. After handing over more than 8,000 signatures of support to Montenegrin State Electoral Commission on 8 March, Milačić started his presidential campaign under the slogan "Bravely, (there has been) enough waiting".

Milačić came fourth in the election, winning 2.8% of the votes. In July 2020, the party joined the right-wing Democratic Front alliance for the 2020 Montenegrin parliamentary election, receiving one representative in the parliament, which elected from the common opposition For the Future of Montenegro list.

In November 2020, the party single MP Marko Milačić left the Democratic Front parliamentary group, continuing to support the formation of the new government. On 8 December 2020, President of the Political Council of the True Montenegro Željko Savović was named Advisor for the Internal Affairs to the Prime Minister of Montenegro Zdravko Krivokapić.

Ideology
The public appearance of the True Montenegro party is based on social conservativism, traditionalism, Serbian–Montenegrin unionism and frequent right-wing populist and nationalist rhetoric. The party views the Serb community, which it represents, as discriminated against. It sees Montenegro as pursuing the concept of a nation-state and the politics of assimilation. The main goals of the party is to overthrow the ruling Democratic Party of Socialists of Milo Đukanović, which has been in power since the introduction of multi-party system, withdrawal Montenegro from NATO, proclamation of military neutrality and withdrawal of Montenegro soldiers from all military missions abroad.

Party leader Milačić maintains cooperation with certain regional public personalities, such as Croatian MP Ivan Pernar, Bosnian conceptual artist and activist Damir Nikšić and Serbian Canadian filmmaker Boris Malagurski.

Elections

Parliamentary elections

Presidential elections

References

Political parties established in 2018
Serb political parties in Montenegro
Conservative parties in Montenegro
Pro-European political parties in Montenegro
Right-wing populist parties